About Face may refer to:

 About-face, a drill command in which a unit or soldier makes a 180-degree turn

Film 
 About Face (1942 film), a 1942 American film
 About Face (1952 film), a 1952 film starring Gordon MacRae and Eddie Bracken
 About Face (2008 film), a Canadian film starring Hugh Dillon
 About Face, a 1991 film by Norman Cowie
 About Face Media, a content marketing agency

Literature 
 About Face (play), a play by Dario Fo
 About Face: The Essentials of User Interface Design, a book by Alan Cooper
 About Face: The Odyssey of an American Warrior, an autobiography by U.S. Army Colonel David Hackworth
 About Face (novel), volume 18 in Donna Leon's Brunnetti series (2009)
 About Face, a short comic by Nate Powell

Music 
 About Face (album), a 1984 album by David Gilmour
 About Face, an album by The Working Title

Television 
 About Face (TV series), a 1989–1991 British sitcom
 About Faces, a 1960s American game show

Episodes 
 "About Face" (As Told by Ginger)
 "About Face" (The Closer)
 "About Face" (Criminal Minds)
 "About Face" (CSI: Miami)
 "About Face" (Duckman)
 "About Face" (Major Dad)
 "About Face" (NCIS)
 "About Face", an episode of Army Wives
 "About Face", an episode of Tales from the Crypt

Other uses
 AboutFace (charity), a Canadian charity providing support for children with facial disfigurations
 Operation About Face or Project About Face, a military operation of the Laotian Civil War
 About Face: Veterans Against the War, former Iraq War veterans, Afghanistan War veterans, and others who are opposed to the U.S. military invasion and occupation in Iraq from 2003 to 2011

See also
 Reverse ferret, a sudden reversal of a narrative
 U-turn (disambiguation)
 Turn Around (disambiguation)
 Turnaround (disambiguation)